Pr (𓉐 Gardiner sign listed no. O1) is the hieroglyph for 'house', the floor-plan of a walled building with an open doorway.

While its original pronunciation is not known with certainty, modern Egyptology assigns it the value of per, but purely on the basis of a convention specific to the discipline. However, the Ancient Greek rendering of the title pr-`3 as   suggests the reconstruction of the historical (Late Egyptian) pronunciation as *par, see Pharaoh#Etymology.

Pr combined with an associated "personal name", god, or location becomes the "house of .... ." An example for pharaoh Setnakhte is the city of: Pr-Atum, (city of Pithom). Pr and ankh-(life) is a "combination hieroglyph" and is the "word" for house of life.  The "house of life" is a library for papyrus books-(scrolls), as well as a possible scriptorium.

The shape of pr in beginning dynasties had variations in the shape of a square, with the opening. See Garrett Reference for tomb of Official Ti.

Pr is one of  hieroglyphs adopted into the Proto-Sinaitic script, the earliest known alphabetic writing system. It was used to represent the phoneme /b/ as in bayt, the Canaanite word for "house", after the hieroglyph's original meaning. The Latin letter B is a distant descendant of this letter.

"Pr-name" /associations

 pr-aa– Pharaoh
 pa-pr-aa– Papyrus
 Pr-Ab– Thoth
 Per-Amun– Pelusium
 Pr-Aat– Heliopolis
 Pr-Atum– House of Atum: Heliopolis
 Pr-Atum– Setnakhte
 Pr-Banebdjedet– Mendes
 Pr-Bast– House of Bast: Bubastis
 Pr-Bastet– Zagazig
 Pr-Djet– a type of early Egyptian tomb
 Pr-Hai– Malqata
 Pr-Hay– Amenhotep III
 Pr-Hay– Great Temple of the Aten
 Pr-Hathor– Aphroditopolis
 Pr-Hedj– Treasury (House of Silver)
 Pr-Medjat– Library
 Pr-Nebu– Treasury (House of Gold)
 Pr-Nebyt– Ramesses V
 Pr-Nemty– Hieracon
 Pr-Ramesses– Avaris, History of ancient Egypt
 Pr-Sekhemkheperre– Osorkon I
 Pr-Sopdu– Sopdu
 Pr-t– Season of the Emergence
 Pr-Temu Tjeku– Necho II
 Pr-Wadjet– Buto, Wadjet
 Pr-Yinepu– Anubis

See also
List of Egyptian hieroglyphs
Pr-Bast
Pr-Medjed
Pr-Nemty
Pr-Wadjet
Pi-Ramesses
Pi-Sekhemkheperre
 Per-Sopdu
 Egyptian biliteral signs

Notes

 The Per Ankh was also known as "The House of Life."It was made by Thoth, the Egyptian god.

References

Garrett, Kenneth. Treasures of Egypt, National Geographic Collector's Ed. No. 5. Kenneth Garrett, Egyptian Museum, Cairo. 2003.

External links
Per-Ankh ; Article ; List of sources to the Per-ankh
Per-ankh: The House of Life

Egyptian hieroglyphs: buildings and parts-of-buildings-etc